Same Old Song is a 1997 French comedy-drama film. It was directed by Alain Resnais, and written by Agnès Jaoui and Jean-Pierre Bacri. Jaoui and Bacri also starred in the film with Sabine Azéma, Lambert Wilson, André Dussollier and Pierre Arditi.

Plot 
Odile (Azéma), a business executive, is married to weak, furtive Claude (Arditi). In the past Odile was close to successful businessman Nicolas (Bacri), now married with kids and returning to Paris after an eight-year absence. She is looking for a new, bigger apartment from estate agent Marc (Wilson). Her younger sister Camille (Jaoui), has just completed her doctoral thesis in history and is a Paris tour guide. Simon (Dussollier) is a regular on Camille's tours because he's attracted to her, although he claims to be researching his historical radio dramas. Camille has fallen for Marc, and they begin an affair. Nicolas is also looking for an apartment, since he hopes to eventually have his family join him in Paris.

The most original feature of this "musical" is that characters break into songs as sung by the original artists, i.e. depending on the circumstances, a female character may all of a sudden start singing in a male voice and vice versa. The judicious choice of songs and variety of styles make for some very funny surprises, considering the complete and voluntary absence of transitions between the talking and singing. The film's debt to Dennis Potter is acknowledged with a dedication in the opening credits.

Cast
Pierre Arditi as Claude Lalande
Sabine Azéma as Odile Lalande, Claude's wife
Jean-Pierre Bacri as Nicolas
André Dussollier as Simon
Agnès Jaoui as Camille, Odile's younger sister
Lambert Wilson as Marc Duveyrier, Simon's boss
Jane Birkin as Jane, the wife of Nicolas
Françoise Bertin as Little Lady on Tour
Jean-Paul Roussillon as the father of Odile and Camille
Jean-Pierre Darroussin as the man with the cheque
Claire Nadeau and Frédérique Cantrel as Female Guest

Songs 

 Josephine Baker : J'ai deux amours
 Dalida and Alain Delon : Paroles, paroles
 Charles Aznavour : Et moi dans mon coin
 René Koval : C'est dégoutant mais nécessaire
 Simone Simon : Afin de plaire à son papa
 Gaston Ouvrard : Je n'suis pas bien portant
 Albert Préjean : Je m'donne
 Jacques Dutronc : J'aime les filles
 Michel Sardou : Déjà vu
 Gilbert Bécaud : Nathalie
 Maurice Chevalier : Dans la vie faut pas s'en faire
 Arletty and Aquistapace : Et le reste
 Édith Piaf: J'm'en fous pas mal
 Alain Bashung : Vertige de l'amour
 Sheila : L'école est finie
 Serge Lama : Je suis malade
 Léo Ferré : Avec le temps
 Henri Garat : Avoir un bon copain

 Jane Birkin : Quoi
 France Gall : Résiste
 Albert Préjean : Amusez-vous
 Henri Garat : La tête qu'il faut faire
 Alain Souchon : Sous les jupes des filles
 Eddy Mitchell : La dernière séance
 Sylvie Vartan : La plus belle pour aller danser
 Serge Gainsbourg : Je suis venu te dire que je m'en vais
 Eddy Mitchell : Je vous dérange
 Téléphone : Ça c'est vraiment toi
 Dranem : Quand on perd la tête
 Johnny Hallyday : Ma gueule
 Pierre Perret : Mon p'tit loup
 Claude François : Le mal-aimé
 Michel Jonasz : J'veux pas qu'tu t'en ailles
 Julien Clerc : Ce n'est rien
 Claude François : Chanson populaire
 Eddy Mitchell : Blues du blanc

Accolades 
The film won the César Award for Best Film, Best Actor, Best Supporting Actor, Best Supporting Actress, Best Writing, Best Editing and Best Sound in 1998. It won the Louis Delluc Prize in 1997. At the 48th Berlin International Film Festival in 1998, Resnais won the Silver Bear for outstanding artistic contribution.

References

External links

1997 romantic comedy-drama films
1997 films
Best Film César Award winners
Films directed by Alain Resnais
Films featuring a Best Actor César Award-winning performance
Films featuring a Best Supporting Actor César Award-winning performance
Films featuring a Best Supporting Actress César Award-winning performance
Films set in Paris
Films shot in Paris
1990s French-language films
French musical comedy-drama films
1990s musical comedy-drama films
Louis Delluc Prize winners
Jukebox musical films
Silver Bear for outstanding artistic contribution
1997 comedy films
1997 drama films
1990s French films